"You" is a song by American singer Jacquees. It is the third single from his debut studio album 4275 (2018), appearing as a bonus track. The song also appears on his collaborative EP Lost at Sea 2 (2018) with American rapper Birdman. The song was produced by London on da Track.

Composition
Karlton Jamal of HotNewHipHop described the song as "silky smooth". The song finds Jacquees confessing his love for a girl.

Music video
A music video for the song was released on November 9, 2018. In it, Jacquees ponders on proposing to a woman he loves. The woman believes he is cheating, but he attempts to show her that he would rather be with her than anyone else.

Remix
A remix featuring American rapper Blueface was released on January 11, 2019. On the remix, Blueface sings in Auto-Tune and "reflects on taking remedial steps in a relationship".

Live performances
Jacquees performed the song at the 2018 Soul Train Music Awards.

Charts

Certifications

References

2018 singles
2018 songs
Jacquees songs
Cash Money Records singles
Song recordings produced by London on da Track
Songs written by London on da Track